
Year 385 BC was a year of the pre-Julian Roman calendar. At the time, it was known as the Year of the Tribunate of Capitolinus, Cornelius, Capitolinus, Papirius, Capitolinus and Fidenas (or, less frequently, year 369 Ab urbe condita). The denomination 385 BC for this year has been used since the early medieval period, when the Anno Domini calendar era became the prevalent method in Europe for naming years.

Events 
 By place 

 Greece 
 Jason of Pherae becomes tyrant of Thessaly.
 Dionysius I of Syracuse attempts to restore Alcetas I of Epirus to the throne.
 Bardyllis becomes king of Illyria and the Dardani and establishes the Bardyllian Dynasty.

 By topic 

 Education 
 Plato forms his Academy, teaching mathematics, astronomy and other sciences as well as philosophy. It is dedicated to the Attic hero Academus. Philanthropists bear all costs; students pay no fees.

 Astronomy 
 Democritus announces that the Milky Way is composed of many stars.

Births 
 Mentor of Rhodes, Greek mercenary and satrap (approximate date)

Deaths 
 Camissares, Persian satrap of Cilicia
 Chuzi II, Chinese ruler of the Zhou Dynasty (approximate date)

References